Markus Unger (born 18 November 1981 in Fulda) is a retired German footballer.

Career

Unger spent his early career mostly as a journeyman in the 3rd and 4th division of German football, most notably with Kickers Emden during the 2008–09 3. Liga season. In 2010, he joined Eintracht Braunschweig, where he helped the club to gain promotion back to the 2. Bundesliga. Unger went on to play the first 2. Bundesliga season of his career the next year, making 4 appearances. He retired from professional football in 2012, but will stay with the club both as a player and as assistant coach of Eintracht Braunschweig's reserve team. In 2014, Unger announced his retirement as a player, but stayed on as Eintracht Braunschweig II's assistant manager and as a coach at the club's youth academy.

References

External links

1981 births
Living people
People from Fulda
Sportspeople from Kassel (region)
Footballers from Hesse
German footballers
Borussia Fulda players
Eintracht Braunschweig players
Eintracht Braunschweig II players
Kickers Emden players
KSV Hessen Kassel players
Sportfreunde Siegen players
SSV Reutlingen 05 players
Association football midfielders
2. Bundesliga players
3. Liga players
Eintracht Braunschweig non-playing staff